Mohamed Helal Ali is an Emirati hurdler. He competed in the men's 110 metres hurdles at the 1984 Summer Olympics.

References

External links

Year of birth missing (living people)
Living people
Athletes (track and field) at the 1984 Summer Olympics
Emirati male hurdlers
Olympic athletes of the United Arab Emirates
Place of birth missing (living people)